Steven McMahon (born 22 April 1970) is a Scottish former footballer who played in the Football League for Swansea City, Carlisle United and Darlington, in the Scottish League for Cowdenbeath, Partick Thistle and Clydebank, in China for Foshan, and in the Northern Premier League for Barrow (on loan from Carlisle).

References

1970 births
Living people
Footballers from Glasgow
Scottish footballers
Association football defenders
Association football forwards
Swansea City A.F.C. players
Carlisle United F.C. players
Barrow A.F.C. players
Cowdenbeath F.C. players
Foshan Fosti F.C. players
Partick Thistle F.C. players
Darlington F.C. players
Clydebank F.C. (1965) players
English Football League players
Northern Premier League players
Scottish Football League players
Scottish expatriates in China
Expatriate footballers in China